The Warlords, previously known as The Blood Brothers, is a 2007 epic action war drama film directed by Peter Chan and starring Jet Li, Andy Lau, Takeshi Kaneshiro and Xu Jinglei. The film was released on 13 December 2007 simultaneously in most of Asia, except Japan. The film is set in the 1860s, during the Taiping Rebellion in the late Qing dynasty in China and centers on the sworn brotherhood of three men.

Plot

The film is set in China in the 1860s, during the Taiping Rebellion. It is based on the assassination of Ma Xinyi in 1870. In the beginning, there is a battle between loyalists and rebels, during which all of the loyalists, abandoned by the forces of a rival loyalist commander, are killed except Qingyun, the general. Qingyun goes to a village nearby where the inhabitants, led by two men, Erhu and Wuyang, engage in banditry. He offers his assistance in executing a raid against a rebel convoy, which is successful. However, a loyalist army assaults the village shortly afterward and seizes the spoils for themselves. Around this time, Qingyun begins an affair with Erhu's wife Liansheng.

Since the villagers are poor and starving, Qingyun convinces them to fight against the rebels as an independent loyalist war-band in order to pillage rebel loot and supplies for themselves. Erhu and Wuyang are distrustful of Qingyun, so the three of them perform a blood oath where, under the pain of death, they promise to care for each other like brothers. The war-band wins a series of victories with Qingyun maintaining order by force. He executes two young soldiers after finding out that they have raped women on the battlefield. Qingyun becomes ambitious and prepares to attack Suzhou and Nanjing, which he believes will be rapid campaigns. However, the government becomes fearful of Qingyun's growing influence, and decides to deny reinforcements and provisions. As a result, the attack on Suzhou becomes a year-long siege, and the war-band runs out of food and supplies.

Erhu attempts to kill the enemy commander by sneaking into the city in disguise. From what he can observe, the city is also nearly out of provisions. He is quickly captured, but to his surprise, the enemy commander was already planning on surrendering, and allows Erhu to kill him; in exchange he asks Erhu to promise to spare his troops' lives (who he claims number 4,000 men) and the lives of the civilians under his control. However, having only obtained 10 days' worth of provisions from a rival commander, Qingyun refuses to honor the deal due to the lack of food and manpower to maintain so many prisoners. A brief dispute ensues, after which Qingyun temporarily detains Erhu to keep him from interfering. The prisoners are locked in the palace courtyard and massacred with arrows from atop the walls. Embittered, Erhu considers desertion, but Qingyun convinces him that what happened at Suzhou, to soldiers (albeit surrendered and unarmed), was in the interests of expedience in order to reach Nanjing and liberate millions of civilians/non-combatants, whose lives are in danger if a rival commander takes Nanjing first.

Nanjing is easily taken, and Qingyun, in return for his grand success, is awarded the position of Nanjing's governor. Qingyun continues to press for his social agenda, requesting (and receiving) from the Dowager Empress 3 years' tax relief for his province (which was until recently in rebel hands) to recover from war. As Qingyun waits for his inauguration, he tries to make friends with other members of the aristocracy and government bureaucracy. Erhu, however, has become jaded by the war, and does improper things such as handing out bonus pay without permission. As rumors spread among the Imperial aristocracy about his lack of control over his subordinates (particularly Erhu), Qingyun reluctantly arranges for Erhu's assassination, fearing a loss of reputation and the potential loss of his ability to implement social change. Wuyang discovers the plot but believes it to be motivated by Qingyun's love for Liansheng. Wuyang kills Liansheng but fails to convince Qingyun that the assassination should be called off. Erhu, as he dies, curses the name of a rival, not realizing that he was betrayed by his own brother.

After discovering Erhu's body, Wuyang, still not knowing that Qingyun's hand had been forced with regards to Erhu, attempts to kill Qingyun at his inauguration, but is unable to defeat him. It is then revealed, through a flash-back showing some senior members of the government bureaucracy, that Qingyun was being set up for an assassination, and that the government's real desire was to murder Qingyun for gaining too much influence so quickly. At this point, a government soldier appears behind Qingyun on a rooftop and shoots him in the back, disguising his shots with the volleys of cannon fire set up for the inauguration. Realizing he has been betrayed, a mortally wounded Qingyun allows Wuyang, who finally sees that Qingyun has been shot in the back, to fulfill their blood oath by killing him. The government then frames Wuyang for the murder and gets ready to execute him. The film closes with Wuyang observing that "Dying is easy. Living is harder."

Cast
Jet Li as Pang Qingyun
Andy Lau as Zhao Erhu
Takeshi Kaneshiro as Jiang Wuyang
Xu Jinglei as Liansheng

Production

The film was originally titled The Blood Brothers. Director Peter Chan said it was influenced by the late Chang Cheh's 1973 film The Blood Brothers, which is itself based on a famous high-profile assassination of a local governor in 1870, but denied that it is a remake. He also decided to change the title to The Warlords in order to avoid confusion. (Note that there is another Chinese film with the English title Blood Brothers released in mid-2007.)

When asked why he chose to move away from his familiar turf of romance films, Chan said that The Warlords is actually not a martial arts film at its heart, though it contains elements of the martial arts. He added that he had made a wish to make a film depicting men's affections after watching John Woo's 1986 film A Better Tomorrow over twenty years ago, and has now finally gotten the chance. His goal is thus to "lead [his] audience to reclaim [the same kind of passion]" as in A Better Tomorrow, which he said is lacking in recent films.

Shooting began in early December 2006 in Beijing. Many outdoor scenes were shot in Beijing, Shanghai and the town of Hengdian in Zhejiang province.

The film ran into copyright troubles on 19 March 2007 when Chinese artist Wang Kewei filed a lawsuit against the film company for using his work in the promotional artworks without his consent. Wang claimed that in a short promotional video shown during a press conference held on 11 December 2006 in Beijing, the film company used ten pieces of his work with minor alterations. The film company has not given an official response.

Production of The Warlords officially wrapped up on 28 March 2007. Post-production work was divided among Hong Kong, Los Angeles and Bangkok.

Jet Li received US$15 million, while Andy Lau received US$6 million and Takeshi Kaneshiro received US$2 million for the film. The film had a budget of US$40 million. The producers explained the huge salary for Li (over a third of the film's budget) by saying Li's participation ensures an international distribution for the film.

Reception

The film won many prizes in many Hong Kong, Chinese, Asian and international film festivals in 2008–2009.

In Rotten Tomatoes the film has an aggregated score of 65% based on 51 reviews.

Perry Lam of Muse has also given the film a generally positive review, praising it for taking "a clear-eyed but sympathetic look at its flawed heroes".

Awards and nominations

See also
List of historical drama films of Asia

References

External links

 
 
 

 

2000s action drama films
2007 films
Best Film HKFA
Hong Kong action drama films
Hong Kong action war films
Chinese action drama films
Chinese war drama films
Films directed by Peter Chan
Films set in 19th-century Qing dynasty
2000s Mandarin-language films
Media Asia films
China Film Group Corporation films
Films whose director won the Best Director Golden Horse Award
Films with screenplays by James Yuen
2007 drama films
2000s Hong Kong films